Ghuryx is a genus of moths of the family Xyloryctidae.

Species
 Ghuryx malagasella Viette, 1985
 Ghuryx perinetella Viette, 1956
 Ghuryx venosella Viette, 1956

References

Xyloryctidae
Xyloryctidae genera